Badminton events at the 2019 African Games took place between 22 and 29 August at the Ain Chock Indoor Sports Center in Casablanca, Morocco. The badminton program in 2019 included men's and women's singles competitions; men's, women's and mixed doubles competitions alongside a mixed team event throughout the eight days of competition. The tournament served as a qualifier for the 2020 Summer Olympics in Tokyo, Japan.

Schedule

Medal summary 
The table below gives an overview of the medal table and result of badminton at the 2019 African Games:

Medal table

Medalists

Men's singles

Seeds

  Julien Paul (final)
  Anuoluwapo Juwon Opeyori (winner)
  Godwin Olofua (semifinals)
  Adham Hatem Elgamal (quarterfinals)
  Ahmed Salah (third round)
  Kalombo Mulenga (semifinals)
  Habeeb Temitope Bello (quarterfinals)
  Melvin Appiah (quarterfinals)

Finals

Top half
Section 1

Section 2

Section 3

Section 4

Bottom half
Section 5

Section 6

Section 7

Section 8

Women's singles
Seeds

  Dorcas Ajoke Adesokan (final)
  Hadia Hosny (third round)
  Doha Hany (semifinals)
  Aisha Nakiyemba (third round)
  Ogar Siamupangila (third round)
  Gladys Mbabazi (second round)
  Aurélie Allet (third round)
  Uchechukwu Deborah Ukeh (quarterfinals)

Finals

Top half
Section 1

Section 2

Section 3

Section 4

Bottom half
Section 5

Section 6

Section 7

Section 8

Men's doubles
Seeds

  Godwin Olofua / Anuoluwapo Juwon Opeyori (final)
  Koceila Mammeri / Youcef Sabri Medel (quarterfinals)
  Adham Hatem Elgamal / Ahmed Salah (semifinals)
  Michael Opoku Baah / Daniel Sam (second round)

Finals

Top half
Section 1

Section 2

Bottom half
Section 3

Section 4

Women's doubles
Seeds

  Doha Hany / Hadia Hosny (champion)  Dorcas Ajoke Adesokan / Uchechukwu Deborah Ukeh (final)
  Aurélie Allet / Kobita Dookhee (quarterfinals)
  Evelyn Siamupangila / Ogar Siamupangila (second round)

Finals

Top half
Section 1

Section 2

Bottom half
Section 3

Section 4

Mixed doubles
Seeds

  Ahmed Salah / Hadia Hosny (quarterfinals)
  Adham Hatem Elgamal / Doha Hany (final)
  Enejoh Abah / Peace Orji (semifinals)
  Koceila Mammeri / Linda Mazri (champion)'  Aatish Lubah / Kobita Dookhee (quarterfinals)  Kalombo Mulenga / Ogar Siamupangila (quarterfinals)  Gideon Babalola / Zainab Damilola Alabi (quarterfinals)  Julien Paul / Aurélie Allet (semifinals)''

Finals

Top half

Section 1

Section 2

Section 3

Section 4

Bottom half

Section 5

Section 6

Section 7

Section 8

Mixed team event

Group stage

Group A

Group B

Group C

Group D

Knockout stage

Participating nations 
A total of 105 athletes from 17 nations competed in badminton at the 2019 African Games:

References

External links
 Individual event results
 Team event results
 Results book

2019 African Games
African Games
2019 African Games
2019